Suryakumar Pandey (born 10 October 1954) is an Indian poet, humorist, satirist and writer. During his literary career, Pandey has contributed to various genres of Hindi literature including Hasya Kavita (humorous comic poetry), Vyangya (satire) and Bal Kavita (children's rhymes) etc... He is most recognized as a Hasya kavi and for his distinctive style and language of hasya kavita  Popularly known as Pandeyji, he is also well known for his Hāsya kavita (humorous Hindi poetry) recitations at Hindi kavi sammelans both in India and globally.

Early and personal life 
Born in Ballia (Eastern Uttar Pradesh), Suryakumar Pandey went to primary school in Ballia, before moving to Lucknow in 1967. After obtaining his Masters in Mathematical Statistics from University of Lucknow, Suryakumar Pandey held several key posts in Health Department of Uttar Pradesh Government. He retired from his government duties in December 2015.

Literary career
Since his youth Suryakumar Pandey has been an active Hindi poet and writer. He has contributed to several genres of Hindi literature, including Hasya Kavita (humorous comic poetry), Vyangya (satire articles), Geet (songs) and Bal Kavita (children's rhymes). Hasya kavita is his forte.

Hasya Kavita  
Pandey is among the most recognized Hindi Hasya Kavi (comic poets). He is known for his distinctive style of writing.

Kavi Sammelans
Suryakumar Pandey has performed at more than 4,000 shows and kavi sammelans in over four decades. In 2016, Pandey toured more than 20 cities in the USA and Canada for Hindi Kavi Sammelans and conferences conducted by the International Hindi Association for the promotion of Hindi literature in America and he also done wah wah kya bat he TV show.  
 
Television and Radio 
He has been actively associated with radio and television. Suryakumar Pandey has long been a poet of choice for Doordashan and Akashvani (All India Radio) for scripting shows, writing songs, solo poetry recitations and kavi sammelans. He has recited his poetry for several national television channels including  Doordarshan, DD Bharti, ABP News, Aaj Tak, News Nation, ETV Network, SAB TV, Sony Pal , Zee News, Sahara Samay, APN News etc. In recent years, he has made multiple appearances in Wah! Wah! Kya Baat Hai! on SAB TV.

Vyangya (Hindi Satire)
Suryakumar Pandey has penned down thousands of vyangya (Hindi satire) articles. He writes regularly for several national Hindi newspapers.

Bal Kavita (Hindi Children Rhymes)
Suryakumar Pandey is one of the biggest names in bal kavita. His poems are included in many school books in India.

Books
Suryakumar Pandey has written more than 25 books in different genres of Hindi literature. 
Some of his books include: 
 Chikne Ghade 
 Waah Waah 
 Rukawat Ke Liye Khed Hai 
 Pandeyji ke Pathakhe 
 Pandeyji ke Thahake 
 Pet Mein Dadhiyan Hain 
 Waah Ji Pandey Ji Waah Waah
 Apne Yahan Sab Chalta Hai
 Hasya Vyangya Sartaj Suryakumar Pandey
 Geet Manjari
 Mera Harapan Shesh Hai (101 Geet)
 Laat Sahab ke Thath
 Khari Maskhari
 Aadha Phagun Aadha June
 Chauri-Chaura : Jankranti ka Naya Savera
 Meri Priy Bal Kavitayein 
.

Awards, honours and recognitions
In recognition of his contribution to Hindi literature, Suryakumar Pandey has received many prestigious awards including 
 International Vyangya Shiromani Samman by International Hindi Association, Washington, D.C.(2016) 
 Kaka Hathrasi Puraskar 
 Pt. Shrinarayan Chaturvedi Vyangya Puruskar by Uttar Pradesh Hindi Sansthan 
 Soor Purskar by Uttar Pradesh Hindi Sansthan
 Sohanlal Dwivedi Samman by Uttar Pradesh Hindi Sansthan 
 Attahhas Samman by Madhyam Sahityik Sansthan
 Saraswati Sahitya Samman (1998)
 Bhartendu Harishchandra Award, by Ministry of Information and Broadcasting, Government of India (2004) 
 Vyangyashri Samman by Madhuban, Rajasthan
 K.P. Saxena Varishth Vyangyakar Samman (2017)
 Sahityashri Samman by Hindi-Urdu Sahitya Award Committee  
 Amritlal Nagar Samman by Fankaar Society
 Awadh ki Shaan Alankaran by Ramanik Society (2018)
 Bal Sahitya Bharti Samman by Uttar Pradesh Hindi Sansthan (2018)
 Bhushundi Saraswat Samman (2021)
 First International Premchand Samman, Norway by Indo-Norwegian Information and Cultural Forum, Norway (2021)
 First Shambhu Prasad Srivastava Sahitya Srijan Samman by Sankalp Shrishti (2021) 
 Gyanada Gaurav Yugpurush Samman by Guide Social Welfare Organisation (2021)

References

External links
 http://suryakumarpandeysahitya.blogspot.in/

1954 births
Indian male poets
Living people
Hindi-language poets
Poets from Uttar Pradesh